Harry Coppell (born 11 July 1996) is an English athlete specialising in the pole vault.

He became British champion when winning the pole vault event at the 2019 British Athletics Championships. He then successfully defended his title at the 2020 British Athletics Championships with a British record jump of 5.85 metres. In 2021, Coppell placed 7th at the Summer Olympics in Tokyo.

References

Living people
1996 births
English male pole vaulters
British male pole vaulters
World Youth Championships in Athletics winners
British Athletics Championships winners
Athletes (track and field) at the 2020 Summer Olympics
Olympic athletes of Great Britain
Commonwealth Games bronze medallists for England
Commonwealth Games medallists in athletics
Athletes (track and field) at the 2022 Commonwealth Games
Medallists at the 2022 Commonwealth Games